Jon-Adrian Velazquez is a former inmate of the maximum security Sing-Sing prison in New York who was serving a 25 years to life sentence after being convicted of the 1998 murder of a retired police officer.  His case garnered considerable attention from the media ten years after his conviction, due to a visit and support from Martin Sheen and a long-term investigation by Dateline NBC producer Dan Slepian.

On May 8, 2022 The New York Times published an extensive feature on how Velazquez was Slepian's "one man innocent project" inside Sing Sing prison to help free several innocent men.

On February 13, 2023, NBC News announced the launch of "Letters From Sing Sing", a 7-episode podcast, the first from NBC News Studios, detailing Slepian's 20-year search for the truth and his journey with Velazquez along the way.

The murder

Retired NYPD officer Albert Ward was murdered during an attempted robbery of his illegal gambling establishment in Harlem, New York on January 27, 1998.  Ward was involved in the running of the establishment at the time.  Witnesses initially claimed that the two assailants were both black, and that the shooter was a black man with braids. Velazquez is Latino and had short hair at the time.

The Case and Dateline NBC investigation
Beginning around 2002, Velazquez wrote letters to Dateline producer Dan Slepian, after hearing about another one of Slepian's documentaries that resulted in getting another conviction overturned.  Dateline producers began an investigation that lasted ten years, tracking down and interviewing witnesses and others involved in the case.

Velazquez contends that he was speaking on the phone with his mother at the time of the murder, a claim that is supported by phone records showing a call between Velazquez's residence and his mother.  The prosecution contended that it was his girlfriend on the phone at the time.  One witness who testified in court incorrectly identified a juror instead of Velazquez when asked to point out the perpetrator.  Other witnesses were a heroin addict and his drug dealer.  Velazquez was initially identified in the case by presenting one of the witnesses with hundreds of images of people previously convicted of unrelated crimes.

The broadcast about Velazquez's case aired nationally on NBC on February 12, 2012 and was nominated for three Emmy awards.

The broadcast sparked a review of Velazquez's case by the Manhattan District Attorney's Conviction Integrity Unit.  On April 5, 2013, the unit decided to let the conviction stand.  In response to the DA's unwillingness to further pursue his bid for innocence, on May 2, 2013 his legal council officially files a motion 440 with the court in New York City.

On December 5, 2014, Velazquez 440 motion—his request to have a hearing—was denied, but he appealed

On June 27, 2017, Velazquez once again entered a 440 motion due to newly discovered documents that were never provided by the District Attorney's office to his original defense.  This "Brady Material" was the basis for his new motion and as late as November 2017 even more undisclosed documents pertinent to his defense were discovered.

On August 17, 2021, After nearly 24 years of imprisonment, Jon-Adrian Velazquez was granted clemency by New York Governor Andrew Cuomo. Jon-Adrian's legal team and family issued the following statement. "We are elated that JJ Velazquez, a man who has spent more than two decades in prison for a crime he didn't commit, will finally be going home. And of course, we are deeply grateful to Governor Cuomo for this enlightened exercise of his executive clemency powers."

On September 9, 2021, After 23 years, 8 months and 7 days of imprisonment, Jon-Adrian Velazquez was freed from Sing Sing Correctional facility."

References

People convicted of murder by New York (state)
Living people
Sing Sing
Year of birth missing (living people)